A by-election was held for the New South Wales Legislative Assembly electorate of Orange on 3 July 1867 because William Forlonge was insolvent and resigned his seat.

Dates

Results

William Forlonge was insolvent and resigned.

See also
Electoral results for the district of Orange
List of New South Wales state by-elections

Notes

References

1867 elections in Australia
New South Wales state by-elections
1860s in New South Wales